The following games were initially announced as Nintendo 3DS titles, however were subsequently cancelled or postponed indefinitely by developers or publishers.

References

 
Nintendo 3DS games
Nintendo 3DS